The Church in Trzęsacz refers to a series of three churches built in Trzęsacz, Poland. The first, constructed of wood, was reportedly built in 1124; the second one, made of bricks, around 1270; and finally the third one, sometime in the late 14th or early 15th century. At that time, it was located almost two kilometers from the sea (according to many sources, 1800 meters). Furthermore, north of Trzęsacz there was another village, which had completely been taken over by water. Originally, the church was Roman Catholic, but in the early 16th century, after the Reformation, it became Protestant. According to some chronicles, it was the third Christian temple in Pomerania.

Abrasion
Over time, the process of abrasion (more generally known as erosion) caused the land surrounding the church to recede at the expense of the Baltic Sea. Year by year, water would come closer; in 1750 the sea was as close as 58 meters, in 1771 parts of the cemetery were swallowed, and 1820 the distance shrank to 13 meters. Finally, on August 2, 1874, the last service took place in the temple. Afterwards, all furnishings were transported to the cathedral in Kamień Pomorski, with the exception of the triptych, which is now kept in a church in Rewal. By 1885 the temple stood over a chasm and, with permission of the Prussian government, it was deprived of the roof and left abandoned.

On the night of April 8–9, 1901 the most vulnerable, northern wall of the church collapsed. During the following years, part by part, most of the construction was swallowed by the sea, which mercilessly moves south, taking away the land. The last drop took place on February 1, 1994, when part of the southern wall collapsed.

According to scientists, since the turn of the 19th century the sea has taken around 40 centimeters of land a year. Over time, local governments – both Prussian and (after 1945) Polish – tried to save the temple with fascine and concrete blocks, but all attempts were unsuccessful. Currently, intensive works are taking place to save the ruin, as this is the only one of its kind in Europe. One of the projects stated that the last remains of the wall should be moved southwards, further away from the sea, but the risk of complete collapse of the ruin was too high.

Photo gallery

Sources

Polish
A page about the church, together with historical photos
http://www.muzeum-trzesacz.pl/trzesacz.htm
http://www.rewal.pl/trzesacz/trzesacz.htm/
https://web.archive.org/web/20050112201225/http://www.kroki.ps.pl/miejsca/trzesacz.php

German
http://www.ostsee-urlaub-polen.de/pobierowo/trzesac_hoff.htm
http://www.hs.ta.pl/plaintext/kategorie3/index.html

External links
Church in Trzesacz, 1870
A photo of the church, 1909
Church in 1935
Ruins of the church, around 1970
Last remaining wall, 2000s
http://www.panoramio.com/photo/3579358
The process of destruction of the church - animation
Photo Gallery
Kościół św. Mikołaja w Trzęsaczu (ruiny) - Hoffer Kirchenruine,Kirchen Ruine in Hoff na portalu polska-org.pl

Churches in Poland
Ruins in Poland
Gryfice County
Churches in West Pomeranian Voivodeship